Vellakinar is one of the suburban areas of Alappuzha.
The Vinayak Temple at Vellakinar is a major landmark. The Seven Seas trading company is located at Vellakinar. It is also a popular residential area due to its close proximity to the town while still being relatively calm. The District Ayurvedic Hospital is also located here. Muhammad Farhan leaves near valiyamaram which is on Vellakkinar. 

Cities and towns in Alappuzha district